Marinella - Portreto (Greek: Μαρινέλλα - Πορτραίτο) is a compilation of recordings by popular Greek singer Marinella, under the PolyGram Records - Philips series "Portreto (Portrait)". This album is part of the compilation. It was released in 1980 in Greece and includes 14 recordings by Marinella from 1974 - 1979 for the PolyGram Records.

Track listing 
Side One.
 "Simera" (Σήμερα) – (Giorgos Hadjinasios - Mimis Theiopoulos)
 This song had been released on I Marinella Tou Simera.
 "Ego ki esy (Ta logia ine peritta)" (Εγώ κι εσύ) in duet with Tolis Voskopoulos – (Tolis Voskopoulos - Mimis Theiopoulos)
 This song had been released on Marinella & Tolis Voskopoulos – Ego Ki' Esy.
 "Kalytera" (Καλύτερα) – (Nikos Ignatiadis)
 This song had been released on S' Agapo.
 "Echis liga chronia, echis" (Έχεις λίγα χρόνια, έχεις) – (Giorgos Hadjinasios - Michalis Bourboulis)
 This song had been released on I Marinella Tou Simera.
 "Pedi ap' tin Anavysso" (Παιδί απ' την Ανάβυσσο) – (Giorgos Hadjinasios-Michalis Bourboulis)
 This song had been released on I Marinella Tou Simera.
 "Avrio" (Αύριο) – (Giorgos Krimizakis - Sotia Tsotou)
 This song had been released on Marinella Gia Panta.
 "Ti ki an perasan chronia" (Τι κι αν περάσαν χρόνια) – (Nikos Ignatiadis - Yiannis Parios)
 This song had been released on S' Agapo.
Side Two.
 "Tha 'thela na isoun" (Θα 'θελα να ήσουν) feat. The Athenians & Tzavara Twins – (Giorgos Hadjinasios - Nikos Vrettos)
 This song had been released on Marinella & Athenians.
 "Na pezi to tranzistor" (Να παίζει το τρανζίστορ) – (Giorgos Hadjinasios - Michalis Bourboulis)
 This song had been released on I Marinella Tou Simera.
 "Pali ypnos de me piani" (Πάλι ύπνος δε με πιάνει) – (Kostas Hatzis - Sotia Tsotou)
 This song had been released on Marinella Gia Panta and as a single in 1975.
 "Antio" (Αντίο) feat. The Athenians & Tzavara Twins – (Kostas Hatzis - Sotia Tsotou)
 This song had been released on Marinella & Athenians.
 "Tora tipota" (Τώρα τίποτα) feat. The Athenians & Tzavara Twins – (Tolis Voskopoulos - Mimis Theiopoulos)
 This song had been released on Marinella & Athenians.
 "Synora i agapi den gnorizi" (Σύνορα η αγάπη δεν γνωρίζει) feat. Kostas Hatzis – (Kostas Hatzis - Sotia Tsotou)
 This song had been released on Marinella & Kostas Hatzis – Recital.
 "I agapi ola ta ypomeni" (Η αγάπη όλα τα υπομένει) feat. Kostas Hatzis – (Kostas Hatzis - Sotia Tsotou)
 This song had been released on Marinella & Kostas Hatzis – Recital.

Personnel 
 Marinella - vocals, background vocals
 Tolis Voskopoulos - vocals
 Kostas Hatzis - background vocals
 Yiannis Smyrneos - recording engineer
 Alinta Mavrogeni - photographer
 PolyGram Records - producer

References

1980 albums
1980 compilation albums
Greek-language albums
Marinella compilation albums
Universal Music Greece albums